Hoàn Lão is the capital of Bố Trạch District, situated via north-eastern Quảng Bình, is located about 13 km north of Đồng Hới.

The township (thị trấn) is located about 30 km east of Phong Nha-Kẻ Bàng National Park a UNESCO Heritage Site.
Hoàn Lão covers 5,70 km² and had a population of 7,372 in 2012.

References

Populated places in Quảng Bình province
District capitals in Vietnam
Townships in Vietnam